Francesco Eschinardi, also known under the pseudonym of Costanzo Amichevoli (13 December 1623 – 12 January 1703), was an Italian Jesuit, physicist and mathematician.

Life
Eschinardi was born and died in Rome. He entered the Society of Jesus in 1637 at the age of 14 and subsequently joined the faculty of the Roman College, teaching logic in 1658, physics in 1659, and metaphysics in 1660. Traveling extensively, he taught at various Jesuit seminaries and Italian universities. He became professor of mathematics in Florence and at Perugia, then from 1665 he was again teaching at the Roman College, where he held the chair of mathematics, geometry and astronomy.

Eschinardi was one of the great Jesuit experimentalists of the latter half of the Seventeenth century. Though still tied to certain traditional patterns, especially in astronomy with the reaffirmation of the geocentric theory, Eschinardi shows a sincere admiration for the innovative work of modern scholars and the desire to follow in their footsteps by using the experimental method. He was concerned with a great number of scientific projects, ranging from the physics of sound to perpetual motion, and he also was involved with attempting to graduate thermometers on a scientific principle. He was an active member of the Physical-Mathematical Academy founded by Giovanni Ciampini and contributed regularly to the Giornale de' letterati from 1668 to 1675. In his “Speech on the cutting of the Isthmus between the Red Sea and the Mediterranean” delivered in 1680 at the Physical-Mathematical Academy, Eschinardi explored the idea of a proto-Suez Canal between the Mediterranean and the Red Sea. Eschinardi had a solid scientific background and knowledge of the works of the proponents of the ‘new science’, from Copernicus to Galilei and Borelli. He often collaborated with his fellow Jesuit Athanasius Kircher. Eschinardi, from his observatory at the Roman College, was the first that discovered the great comet of 1668.

Historians of science today emphasize the importance of Eschinardi's work in optics and in the development of the thermometer.

Works

References

External links 
 
 

17th-century Italian Jesuits
17th-century Italian physicists
17th-century Italian mathematicians
1623 births
1703 deaths
People from Rome
Catholic clergy scientists
Jesuit scientists
Italian Roman Catholics
Scientists from Rome